is a combined railway and metro station located in the city of Higashiosaka, Osaka Prefecture, Japan. It is jointly operated by the private railway company Kintetsu Railway and the Osaka Metro.

Lines
Nagata Station is served by the underground Chūō Line, and is located 17.9 kilometers from the terminus of the line at Cosmosquare Station. It is also a terminus of the Kintetsu Keihanna Line and is 18.8 kilometers from the opposing terminus of the line at Gakken Nara-Tomigaoka Station.

Layout
Nagata Station has a single island platform serving two tracks underground.

Platforms

History 
The station was opened on  April 5, 1985 initially as an Osaka Metro Station. Kintetsu services began on October 1, 1986.

Passenger statistics
In fiscal 2019, the Osaka Metro station was used by an average of 19,527 passengers and the Kintetsu portion of the station by 15,467 passengers daily.

Surrounding area
Hanshin Expressway No. 13 Higashi Osaka Line
 Japan National Route 308 (Tsukiko Hiraoka Line)

See also
 List of railway stations in Japan

References

External links

Osaka Metro official home page 
Kintetsu official home page 

Railway stations in Osaka Prefecture
Osaka Metro stations
Stations of Kintetsu Railway
Railway stations in Japan opened in 1985
Higashiōsaka